Montelupone is a comune (municipality) in the Province of Macerata in the Italian region Marche, located about  south of Ancona and about  northeast of Macerata.

Montelupone borders the following municipalities: Macerata, Montecosaro, Morrovalle, Potenza Picena, Recanati.

Main sights
  San Firmano Abbey, a Romanesque monastery, founded in the late 9th century AD. The sacristy houses a terracotta by Ambrogio della Robbia.
Medieval gates
Palazzo del Podestà and Civic Tower
Civic Gallery
  Church of Santa Chiara
 Collegiate church
 Church of San Francesco
Church of Pietà (15th century)

References

External links
 Official website

Cities and towns in the Marche